Epacanthion is a genus of nematodes belonging to the family Thoracostomopsidae.

The genus has almost cosmopolitan distribution.

Species:

Epacanthion agubernaculus 
Epacanthion ampullatum 
Epacanthion bicuspidatum 
Epacanthion brevispiculosum 
Epacanthion brevispiculum 
Epacanthion buetschlii 
Epacanthion buetschlii 
Epacanthion crassum 
Epacanthion durapelle 
Epacanthion enoploidiforme 
Epacanthion fasciculatum 
Epacanthion filicaudatum 
Epacanthion flagellicauda 
Epacanthion galeatum 
Epacanthion georgei 
Epacanthion gorgonocephalum 
Epacanthion hirsutum 
Epacanthion incurvatum 
Epacanthion longicaudatum 
Epacanthion macrolaimus 
Epacanthion mawsoni 
Epacanthion microdentatum 
Epacanthion multipapillatum 
Epacanthion murmanicum 
Epacanthion nadjae 
Epacanthion oliffi 
Epacanthion oweni 
Epacanthion pellucidum 
Epacanthion polysetosum 
Epacanthion quadridiscus 
Epacanthion saveljevi 
Epacanthion sparsisetae 
Epacanthion stekhoveni

References

Nematodes